Josimar Moreira Matos de Souza (born 7 July 1988) commonly known as Josimar, is a Brazilian professional footballer.

References

1988 births
Living people
Brazilian footballers
Brazilian expatriate footballers
C.D. FAS footballers
Expatriate footballers in El Salvador
Association football forwards
C.D. Sonsonate footballers